Gaudy cantharus may refer to the following sea snail species in the family Pisaniidae:

 
 Gemophos auritulus

Mollusc common names